Zakaria Abahassine (born 23 July 1988) is a Finnish football player currently playing for JIPPO. His father is Moroccan and his mother is Finnish.

References

External links
Guardian Football

1988 births
Living people
Finnish footballers
JJK Jyväskylä players
Rovaniemen Palloseura players
Veikkausliiga players
Finnish people of Moroccan descent
Association football forwards